Michelle Knudsen is a New York Times best-selling American children's author. She has written 50 books for children, including the multiple-award-winning Library Lion, the Trelian middle grade fantasy trilogy, and the Evil Librarian young adult horror/comedy/romance trilogy.

Knudsen graduated from Cornell University and received an MFA in Writing for Children and Young Adults from The Vermont College of Fine Arts. She currently teaches in Lesley University's MFA program in creative writing.

Biography 
Michelle Knudsen is a New York Times best-selling author of 50 books for young readers, including board books, picture books, early readers, and middle grade and young adult novels. Her best-known book to date is the award-winning picture book Library Lion, which has been translated into fourteen languages, is currently being performed as a musical stage production in Israel and South Africa, and was selected by Time Magazine as one of the 100 Best Children's Books of All Time. She is also the author of the Trelian trilogy of fantasy novels (The Dragon of Trelian, The Princess of Trelian, and The Mage of Trelian) and the Evil Librarian trilogy of young adult novels, the first of which was awarded the 2015 Sid Fleischman Award for Humor. Michelle also works as a freelance editor and writing teacher, and is a member of the Writing for Young People MFA faculty at Lesley University. She lives in Brooklyn, NY.

Bibliography

Young adult novels 
 Evil Librarian (2014)
 Revenge of the Evil Librarian (2017)
 Curse of the Evil Librarian (2019)

Middle grade novels 
 The Dragon of Trelian (2009)
 The Princess of Trelian (2012)
 The Mage of Trelian (2016)

Chapter books 
 She Persisted: Nellie Bly (2021)

Trade picture books 
 Library Lion, illustrated by Kevin Hawkes (2006)
 Argus, illustrated by Andréa Wesson (2011)
 Big Mean Mike, illustrated by Scott Magoon (2012)
 Marilyn's Monster, illustrated by Matt Phelan (2015)

Short stories 
 "The Bridge to Highlandsville" in the MG anthology I Fooled You (2010)

Beginning readers 
 Raymond Briggs' The Snowman (1999)
 Dinosaur Days: Road to Writing (2001)
 Colorful Chameleons! (2001)
 Cat Hat (2001)
 Hit or Myth: Road to Writing (2001)
 The Case of Vampire Vivian (2003)
 A Slimy Story (2004)
 Fish and Frog (2005)
 Carl the Complainer (2005)
 A Moldy Mystery (2006)
 Bugged! (2008)
 Smart Shark (2017)

Board books & novelty 
 Noah's Ark (1999)
 Valentine's Day (2001)
 Love (2001)
 Happy Halloween (2001)
 Merry Christmas (2001)
 Easter Basket (2002)
 Easter Egg (2002)
 Happy Easter! (2003)
 Princess Party (2003)
 Fairy Friends (2003)
 Mother's Day Ribbons (2005)
 Hearts and Kisses (2006)
 Easter Fun (2006)

Mass market picture books 
 Angel Babies
 Old MacDonald's Farm
 Autumn Is for Apples (2001)
 Winter Is for Snowflakes (2003)

Coloring & activity books 
 Godzilla: Monster Coloring Fun! (1998)
 Godzilla: Adventures to Color! (1998)
 Godzilla: Monster Coloring, Puzzles, and Codes! (1998)
 Godzilla: Monster Coloring, Mazes, and Games! (1998)
 Star Wars Episode I: Heroes and Villains Coloring Book (1999)
 Star Wars Episode I: Anakin's Adventures to Color (1999)
 Star Wars Episode I: Jar Jar's Coloring Fun (1999)
 Star Wars Episode I: Galactic Puzzles and Games (1999)
 Star Wars Episode I: Jedi Missions to Color (1999)
 Star Wars Episode I: Droids, Creatures, and Vehicles Coloring Book (1999)

Awards

Library Lion 
 One of Time magazine's 100 Best Children's Books of All Time
 Junior Library Guild Selection.
 NAIBA (New Atlantic Independent Booksellers Association): 2007 Picture Book of the Year
 School Library Journal Best Books of 2006
 Amazon.com Best Picture Book of 2006
 Time of Wonder Award from the Maine Discovery Museum
 Book Sense Book of the Year Children's Illustrated Honor Book
 Publishers Weekly Cuffie Award
 Oppenheim Toy Portfolio 2007 Platinum Award
 Nick Jr. Family Magazine Best Books of the Year
 Child Magazine's Best Children's Book Award
 Winter 2006–2007 Book Sense Children's Picks List Selection
 2006 Wilde Picture Book Award
 Irma S. and James H. Black Honor Book
 Arkansas Diamond Primary Book Award Honor Book (2008-2009)
Patricia Gallagher Children's Choice Picture Book Award Nominee (2011)
 The Sakura Medal (2008)
 Nebraska Golden Sower Award (2008-2009)
 Norfolk Libraries' Children's Choice Award (2008)
 Show Me Readers Award Nominee (2008-2009)
 Pennsylvania Young Reader's Choice Award Nominee (2009)
 South Carolina Picture Book Award nominee (2008-2009)
 ABC Best Books for Children Catalog Selection
 Kentucky Bluegrass Award nominee (2008)
 Utah Beehive Picture Book Award nominee (2008)
 Tennessee Volunteer State Book Award Master List (2008-2009)
 Montana Treasure State Award winner (2009)

Big Mean Mike 
 Junior Library Guild Selection
 Amazon.com Best Book of the Year
 Eric Carle Museum Picture Book of Distinction (2012)
 Irma S. and James H. Black Award winner (2013)
 CBC Children's Book Council Children's Choice Book Award finalist (2013)
 Mississippi Magnolia Award winner (2014)
 Wisconsin Golden Archer Award winner (2014)

Marilyn's Monster 
 Junior Library Guild Selection
 NPR's Best Books of 2015
 Kansas State Reading Circle Selection (2016)
 WSRA Children's Literature Committee Picture This! Selection (2016)

Evil Librarian 
 Sid Fleischman Award for Humor (2015) 
 YALSA 2015 Best Fiction for Young Adults
 New England Book Show Winner (2015)
 Green Mountain Book Award Master List (2015-2016)

The Dragon of Trelian 
 VOYA Top Shelf Fiction, Middle School Readers
 Summer 2009 Kids’ Indie Next List selection
 Dorothy Canfield Fisher Children's Book Award Master List (2010-2011)
 SCBWI 2016 Summer Reading List

References

External links

 Author website

21st-century American novelists
American children's writers
American women novelists
Year of birth missing (living people)
Living people
Cornell University alumni
Vermont College of Fine Arts alumni
21st-century American short story writers
21st-century American women writers